Sanguino3 G-Code is the protocol by which 3rd-generation RepRap Project electronics communicate with their host machine, as well as the protocol by which the RepRap host communicates with its subsystems. It can also be written in a binary format to storage for later replay, usually in a file with a ".s3g" extension.

The protocol is intended as a simplification of G-code, to ease processing by the somewhat limited CPU of the Sanguino, an Arduino-based controller.

References

RepRap project
Domain-specific programming languages
3D computer graphics